"I Don't Wanna Wait" is a 1996 song by Norwegian singer  (aka Hanne Qvigstad). Written and produced by Lars E. Ludvigsen and Mikkel S. Eriksen, it was released as her debut single from her first album, Hanaumi (1996). It was a radio hit, but did not reach the Norwegian singles chart VG-lista and was also released in Japan. A music video was produced to promote the single.

Track listing
 CD maxi
"I Don't Wanna Wait" – 3:27
"I Don't Wanna Wait" (Moodmix) – 4:20
"I Don't Wanna Wait" (Clubmix) – 5:46
"I Don't Wanna Wait" (Dubmix) – 5:12

Charts

References

 

1996 debut singles
1996 songs
Songs written by Mikkel Storleer Eriksen
Eurodance songs
Reggae fusion songs
Norwegian pop songs
Columbia Records singles
Epic Records singles
English-language Norwegian songs